Relief is an unincorporated community in Washington County, in the U.S. state of Ohio.

History
A post office called Relief was established in 1889, and remained in operation until 1924. The community was so named from the "relief" residents expressed when their post office opened.

References

Unincorporated communities in Washington County, Ohio
Unincorporated communities in Ohio